Meridian Flight 3032 (MEM3032) was an Antonov An-12BK, being operated as Meridian Flight 3032, which crashed in July 2022 near Kavala, Greece while trying to make an emergency landing at Kavala International Airport.

It was carrying  of munitions when it crashed, which continued exploding till the day after, hindering the inspection of the crash site.

Aircraft 
The aircraft involved first flew in 1971. It was acquired by Ukrainian cargo carrier Aviation Company Meridian in January 2022 and re-registered as UR-CIC.

Crew and cargo 
The eight crew members, all Ukrainian citizens, died in the crash.

According to Serbian defence minister Nebojša Stefanović, the aircraft's cargo was 11.5-tonnes of Serbian-made weapons and ammunition, including mortar shells.

Incident 
The flight originated in Niš, Serbia and was bound for Dhaka, Bangladesh, with stops in Jordan, Saudi Arabia, and India.

Eyewitness accounts and video showed that the plane was already on fire before it crashed.

Secondary explosions were heard for up to two hours after the crash. Residents within a  radius were advised to close windows and stay indoors, while emergency responders, explosives experts and staff from the Greek Atomic Energy Commission were unable to inspect the wreckage due to uncertainty about the nature and state of any remaining cargo and residues. Drones were instead used to examine the wreckage.

Weapons destination 

Amid speculation that the weapons were destined for Ukraine, Serbia's defence minister Nebojša Stefanović stated that the weapons shipment was not linked to the Russo-Ukrainian War, and the Bangladesh Armed Forces confirmed that they were the intended recipients of the weapons, which they bought from a Polish-owned Bosnian company BA-METALEXPORT.

Given Serbia's policy of oscillating between the West and Russia and Serbia's weapons industry and political corruption, political scientist Vuk Vuksanovic continued to question whether the plane was indeed transporting Serbian weapons to Ukraine.

References

External links 
 Playback flight route on Flight Radar 24
 LLC Aircompany Meridian official website

2022 disasters in Greece
Accidents and incidents by airline of Europe
Accidents and incidents involving the Antonov An-12
Aviation accidents and incidents in 2022
Aviation accidents and incidents in Greece
History of Kavala
July 2022 events in Europe